Anna María Sveinsdóttir (born 22 November 1969) is an Icelandic former basketball player and coach. She won twelve Icelandic championships and eleven Icelandic basketball cups, and is regarded as one of the best women's players in Icelandic basketball history.

She was the first player to break the 5000 points barrier in Úrvalsdeild kvenna and finished her career as its all-time leading scorer with 5001 points in 324 games. The scoring record stood until 23 April 2013, when it was broken by Birna Valgarðsdóttir. In 2001 she was voted the Icelandic female basketball player of the century and as one of the twelve players on the team of the 20th century.

Coaching career
Anna María served as a player-coach for four seasons with Keflavík, accumulating a 56-20 record (73.7%) and two national championships.

National team career
Between 1986 and 2004, Anna María played 60 games for the Icelandic national basketball team.

Úrvalsdeild statistics

Regular season statistics
{| class="wikitable sortable" style="font-size:95%; text-align:right;"
! Year
! Team
! 
! 
! 
! 
! 
! 
! 
! 
! 
! 
|-
| style="text-align:left;"| 1985–86
| style="text-align:left;"| Keflavík
| 10 || - || - || - || - || - || - || - || - || 8.9 
|-
| style="text-align:left;"| 1986–87
| style="text-align:left;"| Keflavík
| 18 || - || - || - || .629 || - || - || - || - || 13.9 
|-
| style="text-align:left;background:#afe6ba;"| 1987–88†
| style="text-align:left;"| Keflavík
| 18 || - || - || - || .735 || - || - || - || - || bgcolor="CFECEC" |17.5*
|-
| style="text-align:left;background:#afe6ba;"| 1988–89†
| style="text-align:left;"| Keflavík
| 17 || - || - || - || .576 || - || - || - || - || 16.3 
|-
| style="text-align:left;background:#afe6ba;"| 1989–90†
| style="text-align:left;"| Keflavík
| 18 || - || - || - || .733 || - || - || - || - || bgcolor="CFECEC" |22.2*
|-
| style="text-align:left;"| 1990–91
| style="text-align:left;"| Keflavík
| 13 || - || - || - || .744 || - || - || - || - || bgcolor="CFECEC" |24.0*
|-
| style="text-align:left;background:#afe6ba;"| 1991–92†
| style="text-align:left;"| Keflavík
| 20 || - || - || - || .808 || - || - || - || - || 18.2
|-
| style="text-align:left;background:#afe6ba;"| 1992–93†
| style="text-align:left;"| Keflavík
| 7 || - || - || - || .579 || - || - || - || - || 14.1 
|-
| style="text-align:left;background:#afe6ba;"| 1993–94†
| style="text-align:left;"| Keflavík
| 17 || - || - || - || .742 || - || - || - || - || 16.4
|-
| style="text-align:left;"| 1994–95
| style="text-align:left;"| Keflavík
| 23 || - || .479 || .500 || bgcolor="CFECEC" | .890* || 10.2 || 1.8 || 3.0 || 1.2 || 18.7
|-
| style="text-align:left;background:#afe6ba;"| 1995–96†
| style="text-align:left;"| Keflavík
| 17 || - || .534 || .444 || .792 ||  9.6 || 1.8 || 2.6 || 0.6 || 20.2
|-
| style="text-align:left;"| 1996–97
| style="text-align:left;"| Keflavík
| 18 || - || .481 || .357 || .765 ||  8.4 || 2.4 || 3.7 || 0.6 || 16.9
|-
| style="text-align:left;background:#afe6ba;"| 1997–98†
| style="text-align:left;"| Keflavík
| 16 || 28.5 || .653 || .333 || .868 || 8.3 || 2.9  || 3.0 || 0.3 || bgcolor="CFECEC" | 15.1*
|-
| style="text-align:left;"| 1998–99
| style="text-align:left;"| Keflavík
| 20 || 29.5 || .361 || .200 || bgcolor="CFECEC" | .903* || 9.6 || 3.4  || 4.2 || 0.4 || 12.8
|-
| style="text-align:left;background:#afe6ba;"| 1999–00†
| style="text-align:left;"| Keflavík
| 20 || 29.5 || .472 || .167 || .864 || 9.3 || bgcolor="CFECEC" |4.9*  || 2.5 || 1.4 || 12.6
|-
| style="text-align:left;| 2001–02
| style="text-align:left;"| Keflavík
| 9 || 24.6 || .420 || .333 || .759 || 11.0 || 3.4  || 1.7 || 1.1 || 11.0
|-
| style="text-align:left;background:#afe6ba;"| 2002–03†
| style="text-align:left;"| Keflavík
| 18 || 21.0 || .418 || .455 || .750 || 6.8 || 3.4  || 2.3 || 0.8 || 9.3
|-
| style="text-align:left;background:#afe6ba;"| 2003–04†
| style="text-align:left;"| Keflavík
| 19 || 25.9 || .448 || .414 || .855 || 9.7 || 4.2  || 2.1 || 0.9 || 12.5
|-
| style="text-align:left;background:#afe6ba;"| 2004–05†
| style="text-align:left;"| Keflavík
| 19 || 28.2 || .439 || .354 || .872 || 8.1 || 3.5  || 2.9 || 1.1 || 12.1
|-
| style="text-align:left;"| 2005–06
| style="text-align:left;"| Keflavík
| 7 || 23.1 || .423 || .143 || .625 || 5.4 || 2.9  || 3.1 || 0.7 || 8.1
|- class="sortbottom"
|style="text-align:center;" colspan="2"|Career
|324||-||-||-||-||-||-||-||-||15.4
|- class="sortbottom"

Playoffs statistics
{| class="wikitable sortable" style="font-size:95%; text-align:right;"
! Year
! Team
! 
! 
! 
! 
! 
! 
! 
! 
! 
! 
! 
|-
| style="text-align:left;background:#afe6ba;"| 1994†
| style="text-align:left;"| Keflavík
| 7 || - || - || - || - || - || - || - || - || 121 || 17.3
|-
| style="text-align:left;"| 1995
| style="text-align:left;"| Keflavík
| 5 || - || .526 || .000 || .714 || 10.4 || 1.4 || 3.2 || 0.6 || 95 || 19.0
|-
| style="text-align:left;background:#afe6ba;"| 1996†
| style="text-align:left;"| Keflavík
| 6 || - || .458 || .444 || .909 || 9.7 || 2.8 || 3.7 || 0.3 || 110 || 18.3
|-
| style="text-align:left;"| 1997
| style="text-align:left;"| Keflavík
| 2 || - || .414 || .000 || .833 || 5.0 || 1.0 || 4.0 || 0.5 || 34 || 17.0
|-
| style="text-align:left;background:#afe6ba;"| 1998†
| style="text-align:left;"| Keflavík
| 6 || - || .412 || .429 || .714 || 7.0 || 2.0 || 2.0 || 0.7 || 84 || 14.0
|-
| style="text-align:left;"| 1999
| style="text-align:left;"| Keflavík
| 5 || 35.6 || .400 || .21 || .696 || 10.6 || 4.0 || 3.2 || 0.8 || 76 || 15.2
|-
| style="text-align:left;background:#afe6ba;"| 2000†
| style="text-align:left;"| Keflavík
| 7 || 36.7 || .449 || .500 || .765 || 8.1 || 4.6 || 3.6 || 1.7 || 106 || 15.1
|-
| style="text-align:left;"| 2002
| style="text-align:left;"| Keflavík
| 3 || 31.7 || .500 || .000 || .750 || 9.3 || 3.0 || 2.3 || 1.0 || 17 || 5.7
|-
| style="text-align:left;background:#afe6ba;"| 2003†
| style="text-align:left;"| Keflavík
| 5 || 26.2 || .462 || .182 || 1.000 || 8.8 || 5.6 || 2.8 || 0.6 || 65 || 13.0
|-
| style="text-align:left;background:#afe6ba;"| 2004†
| style="text-align:left;"| Keflavík
| 6 || 32.3 || .386 || .600 || .909 || 13.2 || 4.7 || 2.7 || 0.7 || 82 || 13.7
|-
| style="text-align:left;background:#afe6ba;"| 2005†
| style="text-align:left;"| Keflavík
| 6 || 34.2 || .391 || .474 || .813 || 11.5 || 3.5 || 3.7 || 1.2 || 76 || 12.7
|- class="sortbottom"
|style="text-align:center;" colspan="2"|Career
|58||-||-||-||-||-||-||-||-||866||14.9
|- class="sortbottom"

Note: Rebounds, assists, steals and blocks where first tracked during the 1993–94 season. Minutes where first tracked during the 1996–97 season.
Source

See also
 Icelandic Basketball Association

References

External links
FIBA Europe profile

1969 births
Living people
Centers (basketball)
Icelandic basketball coaches
Anna Maria Sveinsdottir
Anna Maria Sveinsdottir
Anna Maria Sveinsdottir
Anna Maria Sveinsdottir
Anna Maria Sveinsdottir
Anna Maria Sveinsdottir